Emil Bohmiel Leber (May 15, 1881 – November 6, 1924) was a Major League Baseball third baseman who played for one season. He played in two games for the Cleveland Naps during the 1905 Cleveland Naps season.

External links

1881 births
1924 deaths
Cleveland Naps players
Major League Baseball third basemen
Baseball players from Ohio